The Star of India may refer to:
 Star of India (gem), one of the largest star sapphires in the world
 Star of India (flag), flag of British India.
 Star of India (emblem), emblem of British India.
 Most Exalted Order of the Star of India (1861–1947), an order of chivalry associated with British India
 Star of India (ship), a museum ship in San Diego, USA
 Star of India (film), a 1954 British film starring Cornel Wilde
 Star of India (car), Rolls-Royce Phantom II of Maharajah of Rajkot 
 The Star (Pakistan), a defunct Karachi newspaper previously published as The Star of India in Calcutta